This is a filmography for an Indian poet, lyricist and film director Gulzar.

Films

Television

Other work

See also

References

External links

 

Director filmographies
Indian filmographies
Gulzar